Temes may refer to several places:

 Temes County, or County of Temes, former county of the Kingdom of Hungary
 Temes (region), in Hungarian language: Temesköz; old name for the territory of Banat.
 Timiș (river), or in Hungarian language: Temes. Now in Romania and Serbia.
 Banate of Temes, alternative name for Banat of Temeswar
 Temes or Techno-memes